The 2009–10 Chicago Bulls season was the 44th season of the franchise in the National Basketball Association (NBA). They finished with a record of 41-41 (.500) for the fourth time in their past five seasons.

In the playoffs, the Bulls lost to the Cleveland Cavaliers in five games in the First Round.

Key dates
 June 25: The 2009 NBA draft took place in New York City.
 July 1: Start of the free agency period.

Offseason
On May 20, the Bulls promoted Gar Forman to General Manager. Former GM John Paxson accepted a new role as executive vice president of basketball operations. Forman's top priority for the offseason was to re-sign Ben Gordon. Ben Gordon signed with the Detroit Pistons on July 1, 2009.

NBA Draft

Free agency
On July 13, 2009, the Bulls signed guard Jannero Pargo to a one-year deal, helping to fill the void Ben Gordon made in leaving the team. On July 14, the Bulls re-signed guard Lindsey Hunter with a one-year contract.

Regular season summary
On January 25, 2010, the Bulls traded center Aaron Gray for guard Devin Brown of the New Orleans Hornets. On February 18, 2010, the Bulls traded guard John Salmons for forwards Hakim Warrick and Joe Alexander of the Milwaukee Bucks. Meanwhile, the Bulls traded forward Tyrus Thomas for guards Ronald Murray and Acie Law of the Charlotte Bobcats.

Roster

Pre-season

|-align="center" bgcolor="#bbffbb"
| 1 || October 2 || @Indiana Pacers || 104–95 || || || || 11,255(Indianapolis, USA) || 1–0 recap
|- align="center" bgcolor="#bbffbb"
| 2 || October 6 || Utah Jazz || 102–101 || || || || 18,689(London, UK) || 2–0  recap
|- align="center" bgcolor="#ffcccc"
| 3 || October 10 || Milwaukee Bucks || 86–98 ||  || || || 5,642(Milwaukee, USA) || 2–1 recap
|- align="center" bgcolor="#bbffbb"
| 4 || October 13 || @Milwaukee Bucks || 87–86 || || || || 18,119(Chicago, USA) || 3–1 recap
|- align="center" bgcolor="#bbffbb"
| 5 || October 14 || Minnesota Timberwolves || 99–94 || || || || 11,955(Minneapolis, USA) || 4–1  recap
|- align="center" bgcolor="#ffcccc"
| 6 || October 19 || @Orlando Magic || 98–101 || || || || 20,688(Chicago, USA) || 4–2  recap
|- align="center" bgcolor="#bbffbb"
| 7 || October 23 || @Washington Wizards || 93–70 || || || || 20,981(Chicago, USA) || 5–2  recap
|-

Regular season

Standings

Record vs. opponents

Game log

|- bgcolor="#bbffbb"
| 1
| October 29
| San Antonio
| 
| Luol Deng (17)
| Joakim Noah (10)
| Derrick Rose (10)
| United Center21,412
| 1–0
|- bgcolor="#ffcccc"
| 2
| October 30
| @ Boston
| 
| Joakim Noah (16)
| Joakim Noah (10)
| Kirk Hinrich (7)
| TD Garden18,624
| 1–1

|- bgcolor="#ffcccc"
| 3
| November 1
| @ Miami
| 
| Luol Deng (26)
| Luol Deng (8)
| Derrick Rose (5)
| American Airlines Arena15,865
| 1–2
|- bgcolor="#bbffbb"
| 4
| November 3
| Milwaukee
| 
| Luol Deng (24)
| Luol Deng (20)
| Derrick Rose (5)
| United Center19,789
| 2–2
|- bgcolor="#bbffbb"
| 5
| November 5
| @ Cleveland
| 
| Luol Deng (15)
| Joakim Noah (11)
| Derrick Rose (11)
| Quicken Loans Arena20,562
| 3–2
|- bgcolor="#bbffbb"
| 6
| November 7
| Charlotte
| 
| John Salmons (27)
| Joakim Noah (16)
| Kirk Hinrich (7)
| United Center21,108
| 4–2
|- bgcolor="#ffcccc"
| 7
| November 10
| Denver
| 
| Derrick Rose (22)
| Joakim Noah (21)
| Luol Deng, John Salmons, Derrick Rose (7)
| United Center21,409
| 4–3
|- bgcolor="#ffcccc"
| 8
| November 11
| @ Toronto
| 
| Luol Deng, Taj Gibson (18)
| Joakim Noah (11)
| Derrick Rose (6)
| Air Canada Centre16,310
| 4–4
|- bgcolor="#bbffbb"
| 9
| November 14
| Philadelphia
| 
| Luol Deng, Kirk Hinrich (19)
| Joakim Noah (12)
| Kirk Hinrich (7)
| United Center21,837
| 5–4
|- bgcolor="#bbffbb"
| 10
| November 17
| @ Sacramento
| 
| John Salmons (23)
| Joakim Noah (14)
| Derrick Rose (7)
| ARCO Arena12,634
| 6–4
|- bgcolor="#ffcccc"
| 11
| November 19
| @ Los Angeles
| 
| Derrick Rose (20)
| Joakim Noah (15)
| Derrick Rose (6)
| Staples Center18,997
| 6–5
|- bgcolor="#ffcccc"
| 12
| November 21
| @ Denver
| 
| Derrick Rose (28)
| Taj Gibson (12)
| Kirk Hinrich (5)
| Pepsi Center15,823
| 6–6
|- bgcolor="#ffcccc"
| 13
| November 23
| @ Portland
| 
| Luol Deng (25)
| Joakim Noah (8)
| Derrick Rose (5)
| Rose Garden20,383
| 6–7
|- bgcolor="#ffcccc"
| 14
| November 26
| @ Utah
| 
| Luol Deng (25)
| Joakim Noah (9)
| John Salmons (5)
| EnergySolutions Arena19,911
| 6–8
|- bgcolor="#ffcccc"
| 15
| November 30
| @ Milwaukee
| 
| John Salmons (23)
| Joakim Noah (17)
| Derrick Rose (7)
| Bradley Center13,684
| 6–9

|- bgcolor="#bbffbb"
| 16
| December 2
| Detroit
| 
| John Salmons (22)
| Joakim Noah (14)
| Derrick Rose, Brad Miller (6)
| United Center21,523
| 7–9
|- bgcolor="#ffcccc"
| 17
| December 4
| @ Cleveland
| 
| Taj Gibson (14)
| Taj Gibson (13)
| Derrick Rose (7)
| Quicken Loans Arena20,562
| 7–10
|-bgcolor="#ffcccc"
| 18
| December 5
| Toronto
| 
| John Salmons, Jannero Pargo (13)
| Joakim Noah (7)
| Derrick Rose (5)
| United Center20,481
| 7–11
|- bgcolor="#ffcccc"
| 19
| December 8
| New Jersey
| 
| Luol Deng, Derrick Rose (27)
| Luol Deng, Joakim Noah (9)
| Derrick Rose (10)
| United Center17,872
| 7–12
|- bgcolor="#ffcccc"
| 20
| December 9
| @ Atlanta
| 
| Derrick Rose (19)
| Joakim Noah (11)
| Derrick Rose (7)
| Philips Arena16,808
| 7–13
|-  bgcolor="#bbffbb"
| 21
| December 11
| Golden State
| 
| Luol Deng (21)
| Joakim Noah (14)
| Luol Deng (6)
| United Center18,803
| 8–13
|- bgcolor="#ffcccc"
| 22
| December 12
| Boston
| 
| Derrick Rose (19)
| Joakim Noah (13)
| John Salmons (9)
| United Center21,257
| 8–14
|- bgcolor="#ffcccc"
| 23
| December 15
| L.A. Lakers
| 
| Luol Deng, Derrick Rose (21)
| Joakim Noah (20)
| Derrick Rose, Brad Miller (6)
| United Center21,416
| 8–15
|- bgcolor="#bbffbb"
| 24
| December 17
| New York
| 
| Luol Deng (24)
| Luol Deng (13)
| Derrick Rose (6)
| United Center19,791
| 9–15
|- bgcolor="#bbffbb"
| 25
| December 19
| Atlanta
| 
| Derrick Rose (32)
| Luol Deng (12)
| Derrick Rose, Luol Deng (6)
| United Center21,381
| 10–15
|- bgcolor="#ffcccc"
| 26
| December 21
| Sacramento
| 
| Luol Deng (26)
| Joakim Noah (10)
| Derrick Rose (7)
| United Center19,631
| 10–16
|- bgcolor="#ffcccc"
| 27
| December 22
| @ New York
| 
| Derrick Rose (26)
| Joakim Noah (21)
| Derrick Rose (4)
| Madison Square Garden19,763
| 10–17
|- bgcolor="#bbffbb"
| 28
| December 26
| New Orleans
| 
| Tyrus Thomas (21)
| Joakim Noah (18)
| Derrick Rose (9)
| United Center22,008
| 11–17
|- bgcolor="#bbffbb"
| 29
| December 29
| Indiana
| 
| Derrick Rose (28)
| Tyrus Thomas (15)
| Derrick Rose (6)
| United Center21,887
| 12–17
|- bgcolor="#bbffbb"
| 30
| December 31
| @ Detroit
| 
| Derrick Rose (22)
| Joakim Noah (21)
| Kirk Hinrich (6)
| The Palace of Auburn Hills22,076
| 13–17

|- bgcolor="#bbffbb"
| 31
| January 2
| Orlando
| 
| Derrick Rose (30)
| Taj Gibson (12)
| Derrick Rose (7)
| United Center21,162
| 14–17
|- bgcolor="#ffcccc"
| 32
| January 4
| Oklahoma
| 
| Derrick Rose (19)
| Joakim Noah (14)
| Derrick Rose, Kirk Hinrich (7)
| United Center18,838
| 14–18
|- bgcolor="#ffcccc"
| 33
| January 5
| @ Charlotte
| 
| Derrick Rose (24)
| Luol Deng (9)
| Derrick Rose (9)
| Time Warner Cable Arena13,749
| 14–19
|- bgcolor="#ffcccc"
| 34
| January 8
| @ Milawaukee
| 
| Derrick Rose (25)
| Joakim Noah (18)
| Derrick Rose (9)
| Bradley Center18,717
| 14–20
|- bgcolor="#bbffbb"
| 35
| January 9
| Minnesota
| 
| Joakim Noah, Kirk Hinrich (20)
| Joakim Noah, Taj Gibson (9)
| Derrick Rose, Kirk Hinrich (7)
| United Center20,255
| 15–20
|- bgcolor="#bbffbb"
| 36
| January 11
| Detroit
| 
| Luol Deng (27)
| Joakim Noah (11)
| Derrick Rose (9)
| United Center21,014
| 16–20
|- bgcolor="#bbffbb"
| 37
| January 14
| @ Boston
| 
| Luol Deng (25)
| Joakim Noah (11)
| Kirk Hinrich (6)
| TD Garden18,624
| 17–20
|- bgcolor="#bbffbb"
| 38
| January 15
| Washington
| 
| Derrick Rose (37)
| Joakim Noah (15)
| Derrick Rose (6)
| United Center20,304
| 18–20
|- bgcolor="#ffcccc"
| 39
| January 18
| @ Golden State
| 
| John Salmons (37)
| Joakim Noah (16)
| Derrick Rose, John Salmons, Jannero Pargo (4)
| Oracle Arena19,208
| 18–21
|- bgcolor="#ffcccc"
| 40
| January 20
| @ L.A. Clippers
| 
| Derrick Rose (23)
| Joakim Noah (15)
| Derrick Rose (7)
| Staples Center16,794
| 18–22
|- bgcolor="#bbffbb"
| 41
| January 22
| @ Phoenix
| 
| Derrick Rose (32)
| Joakim Noah, Taj Gibson (8)
| Derrick Rose, Kirk Hinrich (5)
| US Airways Center18422
| 19–22
|- bgcolor="#bbffbb"
| 42
| January 23
| @ Houston
| 
| Brad Miller (25)
| Taj Gibson (14)
| Kirk Hinrich (7)
| Toyota Center18,119
| 20–22
|- bgcolor="#bbffbb"
| 43
| January 25
| @ San Antonio
| 
| Derrick Rose (27)
| Luol Deng (9)
| Derrick Rose (6)
| AT&T Center18,581
| 21–22
|- bgcolor="#bbffbb"
| 44
| January 27
| @ Oklahoma
| 
| Derrick Rose (26)
| Taj Gibson (15)
| Derrick Rose (7)
| Ford Center17,562
| 22–22
|- bgcolor="#bbffbb"
| 45
| January 29
| @ New Orleans
| 
| Luol Deng (26)
| Joakim Noah (18)
| Kirk Hinrich (6)
| New Orleans Arena16,578
| 23–22

|- bgcolor="#ffcccc"
| 46
| February 2
| L.A. Clippers
| 
| Luol Deng (18)
| Tyrus Thomas (9)
| Derrick Rose (4)
| United Center19,335
| 23–23
|- bgcolor="#ffcccc"
| 47
| February 3
| @ Philadelphia
| 
| Derrick Rose (30)
| Luol Deng (11)
| Derrick Rose (9)
| Wachovia Center13,295
| 23–24
|- bgcolor="#ffcccc"
| 48
| February 5
| @ Atlanta
| 
| Luol Deng (20)
| Kirk Hinrich (9)
| Derrick Rose (6)
| Philips Arena18,729
| 23–25
|- bgcolor="#bbffbb"
| 49
| February 6
| Miami
| 
| Luol Deng (25)
| Brad Miller (8)
| John Salmons (5)
| United Center22,352
| 24–25
|- bgcolor="#bbffbb"
| 50
| February 9
| @ Indiana
| 
| Luol Deng (23)
| Luol Deng (11)
| Derrick Rose (7)
| Conseco Fieldhouse12,945
| 25–25
|- bgcolor="#ffcccc"
| 51
| February 10
| Orlando
| 
| Luol Deng (23)
| Luol Deng (7)
| Kirk Hinrich, Tyrus Thomas (4)
| United Center21,566
| 25–26
|- bgcolor="#bbffbb"
| 52
| February 16
| New York
| 
| Derrick Rose (29)
| Taj Gibson (10)
| Kirk Hinrich, Derrick Rose, John Salmons (6)
| United Center20,989
| 26–26
|- bgcolor="#bbffbb"
| 53
| February 17
| @ New York
| 
| Derrick Rose (27)
| Taj Gibson (16)
| Derrick Rose (6)
| Madison Square Garden19,763
| 27–26
|- bgcolor="#bbffbb"
| 54
| February 19
| @ Minnesota
| 
| Kirk Hinrich (20)
| Brad Miller (10)
| Kirk Hinrich, Derrick Rose (5)
| Target Center18,183
| 28–26
|- bgcolor="#bbffbb"
| 55
| February 20
| Philadelphia
| 
| Taj Gibson (20)
| Taj Gibson (13)
| Derrick Rose (6)
| United Center22,147
| 29–26
|- bgcolor="#ffcccc"
| 56
| February 22
| @ Washington
| 
| Derrick Rose (22)
| Taj Gibson (8)
| Derrick Rose (6)
| Verizon Center14,113
| 29-27
|- bgcolor="#bbffbb"
| 57
| February 24
| Indiana
| 
| Luol Deng (31)
| Taj Gibson (11)
| Derrick Rose (8)
| United Center20,363
| 30-27
|- bgcolor="#bbffbb"
| 58
| February 26
| Portland
| 
| Derrick Rose (33)
| Joakim Noah (11)
| Derrick Rose, Kirk Hinrich, Joakim Noah (4)
| United Center21,508
| 31-27
|- bgcolor="#ffcccc"
| 59
| February 27
| @ Indiana
| 
| Derrick Rose (27)
| Luol Deng (18)
| Derrick Rose (4)
| Conseco Fieldhouse18,165
| 31-28

|- bgcolor="#ffcccc"
| 60
| March 1
| Atlanta
| 
| Derrick Rose (24)
| Taj Gibson (13)
| Kirk Hinrich (6)
| United Center19,011
| 31-29
|- bgcolor="#ffcccc"
| 61
| March 4
| Memphis
| 
| Luol Deng (23)
| Brad Miller (7)
| Kirk Hinrich (4)
| United Center19,187
| 31-30
|- bgcolor="#ffcccc"
| 62
| March 6
| Dallas
| 
| Derrick Rose (34)
| Taj Gibson (11)
| Derrick Rose (8)
| United Center21,737
| 31-31
|- bgcolor="#ffcccc"
| 63
| March 9
| Utah
| 
| Derrick Rose (25)
| Kirk Hinrich, Hakim Warrick (5)
| Derrick Rose (13)
| United Center18,451
| 31-32
|- bgcolor="#ffcccc"
| 64
| March 11
| @ Orlando
| 
| James Johnson (13)
| Taj Gibson (9)
| Kirk Hinrich (6)
| Amway Arena17,461
| 31-33
|- bgcolor="#ffcccc"
| 65
| March 12
| @ Miami
| 
| James Johnson, Jannero Pargo (20)
| Brad Miller (11)
| Kirk Hinrich (6)
| AmericanAirlines Arena19,600
| 31-34
|- bgcolor="#ffcccc"
| 66
| March 16
| @ Memphis
| 
| Ronald Murray (25)
| Brad Miller (11)
| Jannero Pargo (8)
| FedEx Forum15,413
| 31-35
|- bgcolor="#ffcccc"
| 67
| March 17
| @ Dallas
| 
| Acie Law (22)
| Chris Richard (9)
| Brad Miller, Jannero Pargo (4)
| American Airlines Center20,406
| 31-36
|- bgcolor="#ffcccc"
| 68
| March 19
| Cleveland
| 
| Taj Gibson (20)
| Taj Gibson (13)
| Kirk Hinrich (11)
| United Center23,129
| 31-37
|- bgcolor="#bbffbb"
| 69
| March 20
| @ Philadelphia
| 
| Derrick Rose (23)
| Taj Gibson (7)
| Kirk Hinrich (11)
| Wachovia Center16,098
| 32-37
|- bgcolor="#bbffbb"
| 70
| March 22
| Houston
| 
| Derrick Rose (27)
| Brad Miller, Taj Gibson (12)
| Derrick Rose (8)
| United Center19,834
| 33-37
|- bgcolor="#ffcccc"
| 71
| March 25
| Miami
| 
| Hakim Warrick (14)
| Taj Gibson (10)
| Derrick Rose (5)
| United Center21,592
| 33-38
|- bgcolor="#bbffbb"
| 72
| March 27
| New Jersey
| 
| Jannero Pargo (27)
| Taj Gibson (13)
| Derrick Rose (9)
| United Center20,592
| 34-38
|- bgcolor="#bbffbb"
| 73
| March 28
| @ Detroit
| 
| Ronald Murray (23)
| Taj Gibson (10)
| Derrick Rose (9)
| Palace of Auburn Hills22,076
| 35-38
|- bgcolor="#ffcccc"
| 74
| March 30
| Phoenix
| 
| Ronald Murray, Derrick Rose (23)
| Joakim Noah, Taj Gibson (10)
| Derrick Rose (10)
| United Center21,169
| 35-39

|- bgcolor="#bbffbb"
| 75
| April 2
| @ Washington
| 
| Derrick Rose (24)
| Taj Gibson (16)
| Derrick Rose, Kirk Hinrich (5)
| Verizon Center18,002
| 36-39
|- bgcolor="#bbffbb"
| 76
| April 3
| Charlotte
| 
| Derrick Rose (26)
| Joakim Noah (16)
| Brad Miller (5)
| United Center20,996
| 37-39
|- bgcolor="#ffcccc"
| 77
| April 6
| Milwaukee
| 
| Luol Deng (16)
| Joakim Noah (11)
| Derrick Rose (11)
| United Center20,268
| 37-40
|- bgcolor="#bbffbb"
| 78
| April 8
| Cleveland
| 
| Derrick Rose (24)
| Joakim Noah (15)
| Derrick Rose (10)
| United Center21,707
| 38-40
|- bgcolor="#ffcccc"
| 79
| April 9
| @ New Jersey
| 
| Brad Miller (27)
| Brad Miller (10)
| Kirk Hinrich (9)
| Izod Center15,909
| 38-41
|- bgcolor="#bbffbb"
| 80
| April 11
| @ Toronto
| 
| Derrick Rose (26)
| Joakim Noah (19)
| Derrick Rose, Joakim Noah (7)
| Air Canada Centre19,515
| 39-41
|- bgcolor="#bbffbb"
| 81
| April 13
| Boston
| 
| Derrick Rose (39)
| Joakim Noah (16)
| Derrick Rose (7)
| United Center20,649
| 40-41
|- bgcolor="#bbffbb"
| 82
| April 14
| @ Charlotte
| 
| Derrick Rose (27)
| Joakim Noah, Taj Gibson (13)
| Derrick Rose (5)
| Time Warner Cable Arena17,439
| 41-41
|-

Playoffs
The Bulls managed to clinch the 8th seed in the Eastern Conference over the Toronto Raptors near the final day of the regular season. This marked the fifth time in six years Chicago has made the playoffs. With the lowest seed they faced the number one ranked Cleveland Cavaliers. Poised to win a championship LeBron James and the Cavs defeated the Bulls 4 games to 1 with the over-matched Bulls making a valiant effort in game 5, losing 96-94.

Game log

|- bgcolor="#ffcccc"
| 1
| April 17
| @ Cleveland
| 
| Derrick Rose (28)
| Kirk Hinrich, Joakim Noah (8)
| Derrick Rose (10)
| Quicken Loans Arena20,562
| 0–1
|- bgcolor="#ffcccc"
| 2
| April 19
| @ Cleveland
| 
| Joakim Noah (25)
| Joakim Noah (13)
| Derrick Rose (8)
| Quicken Loans Arena20,562
| 0–2
|- bgcolor="#bbffbb"
| 3
| April 22
| Cleveland
| 
| Derrick Rose (31)
| Joakim Noah (15)
| Derrick Rose (7)
| United Center22,991
| 1–2
|- bgcolor="#ffcccc"
| 4
| April 25
| Cleveland
| 
| Joakim Noah, Derrick Rose (21)
| Joakim Noah (20)
| Derrick Rose (5)
| United Center22,991
| 1–3
|- bgcolor="#ffcccc"
| 5
| April 27
| @ Cleveland
| 
| Derrick Rose (31)
| Taj Gibson (11)
| Derrick Rose (6)
| Quicken Loans Arena20,562
| 1–4
|-

Player statistics

Season

1Stats with the Bulls.

Playoffs

Awards, records and milestones

Awards

Week/Month
 Joakim Noah was named the Bulls CDW/HP Solutions Player of the Month for November.
 Derrick Rose was named Eastern Conference Player of the Week for the week of December 28.
 Derrick Rose was named Eastern Conference Player of the Month for April. During this month, he averaged 25.4 points, 4.1 rebounds and 7 assists.

All-Star
 Derrick Rose selected to Eastern Conference All-Star Team as a reserve.

Season
 Taj Gibson was named to the NBA All-Rookie First Team.

Records

Milestones
First team to win five consecutive games over opponents over .500 on the road

Injuries and surgeries
 On September 29, Aaron Gray suffered a stress fracture of his left fibula. This was determined after he developed a lower leg pain the week of September 26 and he was projected to miss six-eight weeks. On November 16, Gray, still out because of the stress fracture, was admitted to the hospital because of fluid build-up in his right knee. Gray returned to the line-up to make his season début November 26 against the Utah Jazz.
 On November 6, Tyrus Thomas fractured his left radius during a weight training session. He underwent surgery on November 7 and is projected to miss four to six weeks of the season.
 On November 25, Kirk Hinrich sprained his left thumb during practice. Though initially feared to be a similar injury the previous season where he tore the ligaments of his right thumb, an MRI and subsequent examinations confirmed it to only be a sprain and he will only miss one to two weeks.

Transactions

See also
 2009–10 NBA season

References

External links
 2009–10 Chicago Bulls season at Basketball Reference
 2009–10 Chicago Bulls season at ESPN

Chicago Bulls seasons
Chicago
Chicago
Chicago